Columbia International University (CIU) founded in 1923, is a private Christian university in Columbia, South Carolina.

Divisions

CIU has five colleges: the College of Arts & Sciences, the College of Counseling, the College of Education, the College of Intercultural Studies, and the Seminary & School of Ministry.

Accreditation
CIU is accredited by the Commission on Colleges of the Southern Association of Colleges and Schools and the Commission on Accreditation of the Association for Biblical Higher Education. The Graduate School is also approved by the South Carolina Department of Education to offer graduate degrees in early childhood and elementary education leading to certification as a teacher in State of South Carolina.

Student life
CIU has doctrinal affirmations and lifestyle standards which all students (regardless of degree sought) are expected to uphold as a part of admission.

Doctrinal standards
There are seven doctrinal points which students must consent to as a part of their admission to and candidacy for a degree from CIU. These are biblical inspiration, natural separation of humanity from God, salvation by grace through faith in Christ, the historical doctrine of the Trinity, the bodily resurrection of Christ from the dead, the indwelling of the Holy Spirit in the believer, and the evangelical mandate to witness to the gospel of Christ. Additionally, the doctrine of Premillennialism is officially held by the school, but students are not required to adhere to this doctrine. CIU requires all teaching faculty to affirm Premillennialism.

Lifestyle standards
Students are required to sign a covenant form agreeing to keep various lifestyle standards established by the university. Some of the standards include prohibition from alcohol and tobacco. Students are required to complete a Spiritual Growth and Self Assessment – a narrative of a student’s spiritual journey during the year. Though not required during summer and winter breaks, students are expected to maintain CIU lifestyle standards.

Athletics
The Columbia International (CIU) athletic teams are called the Rams. The university is a member of the Division I level of the National Association of Intercollegiate Athletics (NAIA), primarily competing in the Appalachian Athletic Conference (AAC) since the 2018–19 academic year. They are also a member of the National Christian College Athletic Association (NCCAA), primarily competing as an independent in the South Region of the Division I level.

CIU currently competes in 13 intercollegiate athletic teams: Men's sports include baseball, basketball, cross country, golf, soccer, track & field and volleyball; while women's sports include basketball, cross country, soccer, softball, track & field and volleyball.

Additional programs

Ben Lippen School
Ben Lippen is a private, interdenominational Christian school located on the CIU campus. It was founded as a boarding school in Asheville, North Carolina in the 1940s, but was moved to its current location in 1988, offering middle and high school programs. An elementary school away from the main CIU campus was begun in 1989, and in 2006 a main elementary school campus was completed on CIU grounds and classes began there in August. The schools are co-educational and feature a mix of commuting and resident students. The curriculum mirrors most public institutions with the exception of teaching subject from an evangelical Christian worldview and the inclusion of Bible classes and chapel for students, faculty, and staff. In 2013, there were nearly 800 students enrolled at the school.

Notable alumni
Solomon Adeniyi Babalola - Veteran Nigerian Baptist missionary and evangelist, church pastor, church administrator, denominational leader, and theological educator
Doris Bartholomew
Laura Belle Barnard
Chet Bitterman
P. T. Chandapilla
Travis Greene
Nabeel Jabbour
Chad Prather
Joy Ridderhof
Laura Story
Phillip Yancey
Andreas J. Köstenberger

References

External links
 Official website
 Official athletics website

 
Nondenominational Christian universities and colleges
Seminaries and theological colleges in South Carolina
Educational institutions established in 1923
Universities and colleges accredited by the Southern Association of Colleges and Schools
Education in Columbia, South Carolina
Buildings and structures in Columbia, South Carolina
1923 establishments in South Carolina